Francis James "Coddy" Winters (January 29, 1884 – November 17, 1944) was an American ice hockey player from Duluth, Minnesota. Winters, a defenseman, played ice hockey mostly in the Cleveland, Ohio area, including with the Cleveland Indians in the USAHA. In 1920–21 Winters won the USAHA championship with the Cleveland Indians.

He was inducted into the United States Hockey Hall of Fame in 1973.

1915 Elysium Arena riot

On January 2, 1915 Coddy Winters was in the center of a riot at the conclusion of a game between the Cleveland Athletic Club and the visiting Ottawa College team, at the Elysium Arena in Cleveland, the third contest in a best-of-three series between the two teams. According to the Canadians the trouble started when Winters first threatened to "get" every one of the visiting players, and then also verbally abused their coach Father William Stanton with "the coarsest language", and that it later escalated into a full scale riot when Cleveland player Elmer Irving threatened both the referee and the Ottawa players after having been penalized.

The Cleveland version on the other hand laid the blame on Ottawa player Jim Burnett, claiming the riot had started when Burnett slashed Winters across the nose with his stick. In the following melee Ottawa's goaltender Vincent Doran hit Elmer Irving over the head with his stick, after Irving had held down Ed Nagle, which left Irving with a fractured skull. Cleveland's trainer then took part in the melee and hit Ottawa player Redmond Quain over the head with a bottle. The spectators (a 2,000 crowd) then jumped onto the ice to join in, and the police had to be called upon to quell the disturbance, with a number of people getting hurt in the ensuing panic. Vincent Doran was arrested on a charge of assault to kill, for his attack on Irving, and his teammate Redmond Quain also appeared in a Cleveland police court as a witness against the Cleveland team's trainer. Doran was later dismissed by the police court when Irving refused to prosecute him.

College Head Coaching Record

† Winters joined the team mid-season for 1 game before the remainder of the team's schedule was cancelled.

References

Notes

External links
 United States Hockey Hall of Fame bio

1884 births
1944 deaths
American men's ice hockey players
Ice hockey people from Duluth, Minnesota
United States Hockey Hall of Fame inductees
Penn Quakers men's ice hockey coaches
Cleveland Hockey Club ice hockey players